Stark County High School, or SCHS, is a public four-year high school located at 418 S. Franklin Street in Toulon, Illinois, a village in Stark County, Illinois, in the Midwestern United States. SCHS is part of Stark County Community Unit School District 100, which also includes Stark County Junior High School, and Stark County Elementary School. The school is the only high school in the city of Toulon, and lies within the Peoria metropolitan statistical area.

Academics
Academic departments include:
 Fine Arts
 Language Arts
 Math
 Physical Education, Health, & Driver's Education
 Science
 Social Science
 Vocational

Athletics
Stark County High School competes in the Lincoln Trail Conference and is a member school in the Illinois High School Association. Its mascot is the Rebels. The school has 8 state championships on record in team athletics. The Rebels have also been LTC Conference Champs for the last 12 years

History

Stark County High School replaced 6 high schools:
 Toulon High School
 Toulon Township High School
 LaFayette High School
 Toulon-LaFayette High School
 Wyoming High School
 Bradford High School

Timeline
 1847 - Toulon public education program established
 1912 - Toulon High School renamed to Toulon Township High School
 1970 - Toulon Township High School and LaFayette High School consolidate to form Toulon-LaFayette High School
 1992 - Toulon-LaFayette High School and Wyoming High School consolidate to form Stark County High School
 2001 - Bradford High School deactivates and some elective students attend Stark County High School

References

 Interactive Illinois Report Card

External links
 Stark County High School
 Stark County Community Unit School District #100
 Toulon High School history

Public high schools in Illinois
Schools in Stark County, Illinois